Malone is an unincorporated community in Klamath County, Oregon, United States. It is on Oregon Route 39 east of Merrill near the California border.

References

Unincorporated communities in Klamath County, Oregon
Unincorporated communities in Oregon